The Three Colours trilogy is the collective title of three psychological drama films directed by Krzysztof Kieślowski: Three Colours: Blue (1993), Three Colours: White (1994), and Three Colours: Red (1994). The trilogy was a co-production between France, Poland and Switzerland, in French language, with the exception of White in Polish and French. All three films were co-written by Kieślowski and Krzysztof Piesiewicz (with story consultants Agnieszka Holland and Sławomir Idziak), produced by Marin Karmitz and composed by Zbigniew Preisner.

White received generally positive reviews, while Blue and Red garnered widespread acclaim from reviews, with the latter receiving nominations for Best Director, Best Original Screenplay and Best Cinematography at the 67th Academy Awards.

Themes
Blue, white, and red are the colours of the French flag in hoist-to-fly order, and the story of each film is loosely based on one of the three political ideals in the motto of the French Republic: liberty, equality, fraternity. As with the treatment of the Ten Commandments in Dekalog, the illustration of these principles is often ambiguous and ironic. As Kieślowski noted in an interview with an Oxford University student newspaper: "The words [liberté, egalité, fraternité] are French because the money [to fund the films] is French. If the money had been of a different nationality we would have titled the films differently, or they might have had a different cultural connotation. But the films would probably have been the same".

The trilogy has also been interpreted by film critic Roger Ebert as, respectively, an anti-tragedy, an anti-comedy, and an anti-romance.

Connections and patterns
A symbol common to the three films is that of an underlying link or thing that keeps the protagonist linked to their past. In the case of Blue, it is the lamp of blue beads, and a symbol seen throughout the film in the TV of people falling (doing either sky diving or bungee jumping); the director is careful to show falls with no cords at the beginning of the film, but as the story develops the image of cords becomes more and more apparent as a symbol of a link to the past. In the case of White the item that links Karol to his past is a 2 Fr. coin and a plaster bust of Marianne that he steals from an antique store in Paris. In the case of Red the judge never closes or locks his doors and his fountain pen, which stops working at a crucial point in the story.

Another recurring image related to the spirit of the film is that of elderly people recycling bottles: In Blue, an old woman in Paris is recycling bottles and Julie does not notice her (in the spirit of freedom), in White, an old man also in Paris is trying to recycle a bottle but cannot reach the container and Karol looks at him with a sinister grin on his face (in the spirit of equality) and in Red an old woman cannot reach the hole of the container and Valentine helps her (in the spirit of fraternity).

In Blue, while Julie is searching for her husband's mistress in the central courthouse, she accidentally steps into an active court trial and is immediately turned around by security. While Julie is peeking into the courtroom, Karol from White can be heard pleading to the judge in a scene that begins his chapter of the trilogy.

Each film's ending shot is of a character crying. In Blue, Julie de Courcy cries looking into space. In White, Karol cries as he looks at his wife. In Red, the judge Kern cries as he looks through his broken window out at the camera.

Many main characters from Blue and White, including Julie and Karol, appear at the ending of Red as survivors of a ferry accident.

Principal cast
Three Colours: Blue
 Juliette Binoche - Julie
 Benoît Régent - Olivier
 Florence Pernel - Sandrine
Three Colours: White
 Zbigniew Zamachowski - Karol
 Julie Delpy - Dominique
 Janusz Gajos - Mikolaj
Three Colours: Red
 Irène Jacob - Valentine
 Jean-Louis Trintignant - Joseph
 Jean-Pierre Lorit - Auguste

Soundtrack

Music for all three parts of the trilogy was composed by Zbigniew Preisner and performed by Silesian Philharmonic choir along with Sinfonia Varsovia.

Reception
Blue holds a 98% rating on the Rotten Tomatoes review-aggregation website, based on 45 reviews. The second part of the trilogy, White, was ranked with 87% based on 46 reviews, while its final film, Red, was certified "Fresh" on the same website and received 100% based on 53 reviews.

The entire trilogy topped The San Diego Union-Tribunes list of the best films of 1994, was ranked number three on San Jose Mercury News writer Glenn Lovell's year-end list, ten on a list by Michael Mills of The Palm Beach Post, and was also on unranked top-tens list by Tulsa Worlds Dennis King and The Atlanta Journal-Constitution critics Eleanor Ringel and Steve Murray. Roger Ebert ranked the trilogy as a whole at No. 5 on his list of the "Best films of 1990s". He also included the trilogy in its entirety to his "Great Movies" list.

Ranked #11 in Empire magazine's "The 33 Greatest Movie Trilogies" in 2010.

Ranked #14 in Empire magazine's "The 100 Best Films of World Cinema" in 2010.

References

External links

 
 
 
 Voted #15 on The Arts and Faith Top 100 Films (2010)
 Criterion Collection Essay by Colin MacCabe

1993 drama films
1993 films
1994 films
French film series
Films directed by Krzysztof Kieślowski
Films with screenplays by Krzysztof Kieślowski
Films produced by Marin Karmitz
French drama films
1990s French-language films
Polish drama films
Swiss drama films
Trilogies
1994 drama films
French-language Swiss films
1990s French films